The  is an annual professional road bicycle racing stage race held in Mie Prefecture, Japan, named after Kumano. It was first created in 2006 as the amateur level, later moved up to the professional level in 2008 when included into the UCI Asia Tour and classified as a 2.2 category race.

Past winners

References

External links

  
 
 Statistics at the-sports.org
 Tour de Kumano at cqranking.com

Cycle races in Japan
UCI Asia Tour races
Recurring sporting events established in 2006
2006 establishments in Japan
Sports competitions in Mie Prefecture